New Tech High School may refer to:

 Danville New Tech High, Danville, Illinois
 New Tech High at Zion-Benton East, Zion, Illinois
 Calumet New Tech High School, Gary, Indiana
 Belton New Tech High School, Belton, Texas
 New Tech High School (Dallas), Texas
 New Tech High School at Coppell, Texas

See also
 Anderson New Technology High School, Anderson, California
 New Technology High School, Napa, California
 Lake Area New Tech Early College High School, New Orleans, Louisiana
 NuTech (disambiguation)